Ren Hang (born 23 February 1989) is a Chinese professional footballer who currently plays as a centre-back or full-back for Chinese Super League club Wuhan Three Towns.

Club career
Ren Hang started his football career with Changsha Ginde in the 2007 season when he made his debut for the club on 4 October 2007 in a 2-0 loss against Shanghai Shenhua. By the following season, he had established himself as a vital member of the team by playing in 24 games as Changsha finished mid-table at the end of the 2008 season. He continued to be a regular within the team's defense until the 2010 season when the club had a poor run of form that saw Ren dropped from the team as the club was relegated from the first tier.

Before the start of the 2011 season, Ren was allowed to leave the club and he transferred to top tier side Jiangsu Suning. He made his debut for the club on 3 April 2011 in a 2-0 loss against Beijing Guoan. With Ren's versatility in defence where he could also play as a left-back, it would see him become a vital member of the team as results gradually improved and the club finished in their best ever league place of fourth at the end of the 2011 season. He would go on to become the clubs captain and lead the team to the 2015 Chinese FA Cup trophy.

Ren was degraded to Jiangsu's reserve team in June 2016 due to a contract dispute with the club.  On 16 September 2016, he terminated his contract with Jiangsu and joined fellow Chinese Super League side Hebei China Fortune; however, he was unable to play for the club until the 2017 season. He made his debut for the club on 5 March 2017 in a 0-0 draw against Henan Jianye.

On 11 April 2021 he would be loaned out to second tier club Wuhan Three Towns for the 2021 China League One campaign. The move would turn out to be a big successes and he would go on to establish himself as a vital member of the team and help aid the club to win the league title and gain promotion as the club entered the top tier for the first time in their history. The following campaign Wuhan would make the move permanent and he would lead the squad to win the 2022 Chinese Super League title for the first time in the clubs history.

International career
Ren made his debut for the Chinese national team on 18 June 2014 in a 2-0 win against Macedonia. He would subsequently go on to be included in the squad for the 2015 AFC Asian Cup and participated in three games as China were knocked out in the quarter-finals by Australia. He scored his first international goal on 7 June 2017 in an 8-1 win against the Philippines.

Career statistics

Club statistics
.

International statistics

International goals

Scores and results list China's goal tally first.

Honours

Club
Jiangsu Suning
Chinese FA Cup: 2015.
Chinese FA Super Cup: 2013.

Wuhan Three Towns
Chinese Super League: 2022.
China League One: 2021.

References

External links
 
 
Player stats at Sohu.com

1989 births
Living people
Footballers from Shenyang
Chinese footballers
Changsha Ginde players
Jiangsu F.C. players
Hebei F.C. players
Chinese Super League players
China international footballers
2015 AFC Asian Cup players
Footballers at the 2010 Asian Games
Association football defenders
Asian Games competitors for China